Horter is a surname of German origin. Notable people with the surname include:

Charles Horter (born 1947), American competitive sailor
Franck Horter (born 1967), French swimmer

References

Surnames of German origin